Dear Ella is a 1997 studio album by Dee Dee Bridgewater, recorded in tribute to Ella Fitzgerald, who had died the previous year.

For Dear Ella, Bridgewater won the Grammy Award for Best Jazz Vocal Album and Slide Hampton won the Grammy Award for Best Instrumental Arrangement Accompanying Vocalist(s) for his arrangement of "Cotton Tail" at the 40th Grammy Awards.

Reception
Raoul Hernandez of The Austin Chronicle stated, "As with nature, music is in a constant state of regeneration. For every fallen John Coltrane there's a James Carter, for every departed Miles Davis, a Terence Blanchard. Sometimes it takes generations to fill a hole, but new trees sprout every day. One forest in need of re-seeding has long been the Satin Doll woods, where craters left by Billie Holiday, Sarah Vaughan, and Ella Fitzgerald still gape. Only recently has Cassandra Wilson helped fill the gap, and now with Dear Ella, Dee Dee Bridgewater is ready to take her side." All About Jazz review commented, "Overall, this disc is a good, pleasant listen for fans of scatting and upbeat big band swing singing. While the theme is a tribute to Ella, don't pick this up expecting to hear her ghost. While Bridgewater is brave enough to take on all this material and the legend of Ella, she is also smart enough to realize there is only one Ella, and that she needs to sing like Dee Dee to be successful. At times, the melodies involved in several of the songs are obscured somewhat by Bridgewater's R’n’B-ish stylings, but her effort on these songs is real and cannot be dismissed. Bridgewater had the privilege of meeting Ella on multiple occasions, and seems to have been genuinely influenced by her singing and her personality. This project seems to be her way of bidding farewell to jazz's true First Lady of Song."

Track listing
"A-Tisket, A-Tasket" (Van Alexander, Ella Fitzgerald) – 2:32
"Mack the Knife" (lyrics: Marc Blitzstein, Bertolt Brecht; music: Kurt Weill) – 3:59
"Undecided" (lyrics: Leo Robin; music: Charlie Shavers) – 6:22
"Midnight Sun" (music: Sonny Burke, Lionel Hampton; lyrics: Johnny Mercer) – 7:22
"Let's Do It, Let's Fall in Love" (Cole Porter) – 3:31
"How High the Moon" (music: Morgan Hamilton; lyrics: Nancy Lewis) – 5:05
"(If You Can't Sing It) You'll Have to Swing It (Mr. Paganini)" (Sam Coslow) – 6:34
"Cotton Tail" (Duke Ellington) – 2:58
"My Heart Belongs to Daddy" (Porter) – 5:05
"(I'd Like to Get You on a) Slow Boat to China" (Frank Loesser) – 2:57
"Oh, Lady be Good!" (George Gershwin, Ira Gershwin) – 3:39
"Stairway to the Stars" (lyrics: Mitchell Parish; music: Frank Signorelli, Matty Malneck) – 4:10
"Dear Ella" (Kenny Burrell) – 4:56

Personnel
 Dee Dee Bridgewater – vocals
 Cecil Bridgewater – trumpet, arranger, conductor
 Virgil Jones – trumpet, horn, soloist
 Byron Stripling – trumpet
 Ron Tooley – trumpet
 Diego Urcola – trumpet
 Slide Hampton – trombone, arranger, conductor
 Clarence Banks – trombone, horn, soloist
 Benny Powell – trombone
 Robert Trowers – trombone
 Douglas Purviance – bass trombone
 F. Robert Lloyd – horn
 James Anderson – tuba
 Antonio Hart – alto saxophone, soloist
 Jeff Clayton – alto saxophone
 Teodross Avery – tenor saxophone
 Bill Easley – tenor saxophone
 Patience Higgins – baritone saxophone
 R. Taylor – flute
 Roy Jowitt – clarinet
 Alfred Wallbank – bass clarinet
 Richard Morgan – oboe
 Lou Levy – piano, arranger
 Milt Jackson – vibraphone
 Kenny Burrell – guitar, arranger
 Ray Brown – double bass
 Grady Tate – drums
 André Ceccarelli – drums
 Alan Hakin – percussion
 Boguslaw Kostecki, David Nolan, T. Williams, Rolf Wilson – violin
 John Graham, Garfield Jackson – viola
 Peter Willison – cello
 John Clayton – big band arranger and conductor

Production
 Rob Eaton, Keith Grant, Al Schmitt – engineer
 Peter Doell, Koji Egawa, Brian Garten, Alex Marcou – assistant engineer
 Jean Luc Barilla – design
 Philippe Pierangeli – photography

Chart positions

References

1997 albums
Dee Dee Bridgewater albums
Ella Fitzgerald tribute albums
Verve Records albums
Grammy Award for Best Jazz Vocal Album